The Eladio Velez Art School, also known as Eladio Vélez School, is a high Art school technology  Colombia, of private character.

It was founded on February 2, 1979, by the Society of Public Improvements of Itagüí. It is a school specializing in the artistic and cultural world. It also provides various social activities that help strengthen the art and culture of the city.

Headquarters 
Currently has 1 headquarters in Itagüí. It is in honor of the distinguished painter Eladio Vélez.

Initiation
In 1979 is launched the idea of creating an art school private. All with the intention of offering a different alternative in town. Since 1979 Eladio Vélez School has become the city's heritage not only by the artist but by representing the possibility offered to the population of the city.

Courses 
Arts
Painting
Drawing
Watercolor painting
Sculpture
Photography
Manga
Music
Music
Guitar
Piano
Vocal pedagogy

See also 
Art school
Eladio Vélez
Antioquia department

References

External links 
Official website

Visual arts education
Itagüí
Buildings and structures in Antioquia Department
Schools in Colombia